Siamak Sarlak is an Iranian footballer who currently plays for Gahar Zagros in the Iran Pro League.

Club career
Sarlak has been with Foolad F.C. since 2005. He played for Foolad in the 2006 AFC Champions League group stage.

Club career statistics

 Assist Goals

References

1983 births
Living people
Foolad FC players
Damash Gilan players
Iranian footballers
Tractor S.C. players
Gahar Zagros players
Sanat Naft Abadan F.C. players
Association football midfielders
People from Hormozgan Province